Golden Hill Historic District may refer to:

Golden Hill Historic District (Bridgeport, Connecticut), listed on the National Register of Historic Places in Fairfield County, Connecticut
Golden Hill Historic District (Indianapolis, Indiana), listed on the National Register of Historic Places in Marion County, Indiana